This is a list of stock exchanges located in the United Kingdom of Great Britain and Northern Ireland or the various nations regarded as United Kingdom Overseas Territories – UKOTs (also called British Overseas Territories – BOTs), or the British Crown Dependencies.  They are as follows:

Several nations of the Caribbean comprise one of two major regional stock exchanges: the Eastern Caribbean Securities Exchange (ECSE), which serves Anguilla (UK), Antigua and Barbuda, Dominica, Grenada, Montserrat (UK), Saint Kitts and Nevis, Saint Lucia, and Saint Vincent and the Grenadines. The service area of the ECSE corresponds to the service area of the Eastern Caribbean Central Bank, with which it is associated.

References

See also 
 Hong Kong Stock Exchange
 List of British currencies
 List of countries by leading trade partners
 List of Commonwealth of Nations countries by GDP
 List of stock exchanges in the Commonwealth of Nations

 
Economy of the United Kingdom-related lists